The Roman Catholic Diocese of Zielona Góra-Gorzów is a Latin rite suffragan diocese in the Ecclesiastical province of Archdiocese of Szczecin-Kamień in Lubuskie, Poland.

Its cathedral episcopal see is Katedra Wniebowzięcia NMP in Gorzów Wielkopolski. It also has a Co-cathedral dedicated to Hedwig of Silesia (called in Polish św. Jadwigi Śląskiej), in Zielona Góra, and a Minor Basilica, Bazylika Matki Bożej Rokitniańskiej, Rokitno.

History 

 Established in 1945 as Apostolic Administration of Kamień, Lubusz and the Prelature of Piła with see in Gorzów Wielkopolski, on the territories encompassing the Territorial Prelature of Schneidemühl and the part of the Diocese of Berlin, Germany, awarded to Poland, with reference in the name to the historical Bishopric of Lebus and Bishopric of Cammin
 Established on 28 June 1972 as Diocese of Gorzów, part of the ecclesiastical province of Wrocław, from the southwestern part of the territory of the dissolved Apostolic Administration of Kamień, Lubusz and the Prelature of Piła with see in Gorzów Wielkopolski, formerly the western part of the Prelature of Schneidemühl, and the eastern part of the Diocese of Berlin, Germany
 25 March 1992: Renamed as Diocese of Zielona Góra – Gorzów and made part of the newly established ecclesiastical province of Szczecin-Kamień, lost territory to Diocese of Koszalin-Kołobrzeg
 It enjoyed a Papal visit from the Polish Pope John Paul II in June 1997.

Statistics 
As of 2014, it pastorally served 989,400 Catholics (85.3% of 1,160,000 total) on 14,814 km² in 267 parishes a 2 missions with 641 priests (542 diocesan, 99 religious), 283 lay religious (107 brothers, 176 sisters) and 53 seminarians. Like in most Polish dioceses, church attendance has declined in the 21st century. According to the statistics 28.1% of the dioceses population attended church services weekly in 2013, however more than 40% did so back in 2000.

Episcopal ordinaries
(all Roman rite)
Apostolic Administrators and Vicars of Kamień, Lubusz and the Prelature of Piła with see in Gorzów Wielkopolski
1945–1951: Administrator Edmund Nowicki (1900–1971), deposed and banished by Bolesław Bierut government
1951–1952: Vicar Tadeusz Załuczkowski
1952–1956: Vicar Zygmunt Szelążek
1956–1958: Administrator Teodor Bensch (1903–1958)
1958: Józef Michalski
1958–1972 see below: Administrator Wilhelm Pluta (1910–1986), advanced to Bishop of Gorzów

Diocesan Bishops of Gorzów 
 Wilhelm Pluta (see above 1972.06.28 – death 1986.01.22)
 Józef Michalik (1986.10.01 – 1992.03.25 see below)

Diocesan Bishops of Zielona Góra-Gorzów 
 Józef Michalik (see above 1992.03.25 – 1993.04.17), next Metropolitan Archbishop of Przemyśl (Poland) (1993.04.17 – retired 2016.04.30), Vice-President of Episcopal Conference of Poland (1999 – 2004.03.18), President of Episcopal Conference of Poland (2004.03.18 – 2014.03.12), Vice-President of Council of European Bishops’ Conferences (2011.10.02 – 2014.10)
 Adam Dyczkowski (1993.07.17 – 2007.12.29)
 Stefan Regmunt (2007.12.29 – 2015.11.23)
 Tadeusz Litynski (since 2015.11.23)

Auxiliary Bishops
 Edward Dajczak (1989.12.15 – 2007.06.23)
 Paweł Socha, C.M. (1973.11.20 – 2012.01.16)
 Adrian Put (since 28 June 2022)

See also

 List of Catholic dioceses in Poland
 Roman Catholicism in Poland

References

Sources and external links 
 GCatholic.org, with Google satellite map - data for all sections
 Catholic Hierarchy

Roman Catholic dioceses in Poland
Christian organizations established in 1972
Roman Catholic dioceses and prelatures established in the 20th century
1972 establishments in Poland